WebMaker CMS is a UK-based company which markets an online website builder package called WebMaker CMS, a website builder. The product provides free hosting for the first year, which is renewed by annual fee.  WebMaker has a number of add-ons or plug-ins/widgets, enabling customers to add extra features as and when they are needed by selecting them from within the WebMaker product.  WebMaker is sold by the UK marketing agency, Insight Group, based in Bracknell, Berkshire, UK.

History 
Insight Group launched WebMaker CMS in 2011, having already been a designer and builder of websites using higher-level website building solutions such as the Kameleon content management system.

References

External links
WebMaker CMS – official site

Content management systems
Web development software
Web hosting
Service companies of the United Kingdom
Information technology companies of the United Kingdom